Nasim-e-Shomal (Persian: Northern Breeze) was a weekly newspaper that existed between September 1907 and 1933 with intervals. It was one of the publications started following the Iranian constitutional revolution in addition to others, including Sur-e Esrafil and Majalleh-ye Estebdad.

Sorour Soroudi describes the paper as "one-man weekly newspaper". The weekly was pioneer in using poems and satire in presenting the political and social situation of Iran at that period of time and was identified with its founder and editor, Seyed Ashrafedin Hosseini, a well-known poet. Over time Seyed Ashrafedin Hosseini was called Mr. Nasim-e-Shomal.

History and profile
The founder of Nasim-e-Shomal was an Iranian poet, Seyed Ashrafedin Hosseini, mostly known as Gilani. The title was a reference to the Russian revolution of 1905. The paper was launched by Gilani in Rasht on 10 September 1907 soon after the Iranian constitutional revolution. Gilani designed the paper to fight against despotism and to this end, he avoided producing a mainstream publication.
Instead, he covered his poems, satire and other literary work to disseminate his views in an attractive way. His writings were also about women and their functions. The paper came out weekly in Rasht until 1912 when Gilani had to move to Tehran due to the destruction of his publishing house by Russians. In Tehran Gilani published the paper in a publishing house owned by Jewish people and continued to criticize the existing political environment through his poems. During his period Nasim-e-Shomal was the most-read paper in the country selling over 4,000 copies although it was consisted of only two pages. From 1925 when Reza Shah became the ruler the paper did not contain oppositional material.

Nasim-e-Shomal ceased publication in 1933.

Spin off
Following the death of Gilani the title was published by other journalists from 29 May 1934 to November 1940. However, this spin off was not similar to original Nasim-e-Shomal since it became a regular newspaper without its successor's attraction and originality.

References

1907 establishments in Iran
1933 disestablishments in Iran
Defunct newspapers published in Iran
Defunct weekly newspapers
Iranian political satire
Newspapers published in Tehran
Persian-language newspapers 
Publications established in 1907
Publications disestablished in 1933
Satirical newspapers
Newspapers published in Qajar Iran
Pahlavi Iran